Recuerdos (English: Memories) is the thirteenth studio album by the Mexican singer-songwriter Juan Gabriel, released in 1980. Songs from this album were used in the film El Noa Noa.

Track listing

References 

Juan Gabriel albums
Spanish-language albums